The British Rail Class 11 was applied to a batch of diesel shunting locomotives built from April 1945 to December 1952, based on a similar earlier batch built by the London, Midland and Scottish Railway (LMS) between 1934 and 1936.

Overview

Numbering
An initial batch of twenty locomotives was built during World War II, fourteen of which were built for the War Department, with the first ten of these (70260-70269) subsequently going to the Nederlandse Spoorwegen post-war as NS 501–510. LMS numbers 7120–7126 went straight into LMS stock, and a follow-up batch was built, 7129 being the last diesel shunter to be built for the LMS. British Railways continued to build the class from 1948 to 1952, using numbers M7130–M7131 and 12045–12138. 7120–7129 and M7130–M7131 became BR numbers 12033–12044. The whole class of 12033–12138 became Class 11. Locomotives up to 12102 were built at LMS/BR Derby and 12103–12138 at BR Darlington.

Export locomotives

Close to 100 almost identical machines were built by English Electric and supplied to Nederlandse Spoorwegen (NS) as their 500 Class & 600 Class diesel locomotives. In addition to the exported 501-510 mentioned above, 500 Class also included 511-545. Sixty-five of the 600 Class locomotives were built by English Electric between 1950 and 1957, numbered 601–665, at either Dick, Kerr & Co. Works (601–610) in Preston or Vulcan Foundry Works (remainder) in Newton-le-Willows. A further batch of 15 locomotives were exported without engines so that they could be fitted as such in the Netherlands. These were numbered 701-715.

Another export order was to Australia, with 16 locomotives built in 1951 but with the design modified for use on 5 ft 3 in gauge railways. The Victorian Railways bought ten, which were designated as F class, and six were bought by the State Electricity Commission of Victoria for shunting on sidings connected to Victorian Railways tracks.

One member of Class 11 was built for transporting British soldiers in the former Nazi-occupied countries. Throughout the liberation period it travelled through France, Belgium and the Netherlands before finally reaching Germany. It was then used for transporting British troops and for shunting, and was occasionally used on a few branch lines until 1957. The reason for this was that after the war the newly founded Deutsche Bundesbahn was slowly building up its locomotive fleet. As the more powerful German engines began to roll out, the Class 11 diesel was used less and in 1953 it was withdrawn. It stood in Hamm Engine shed, in West Germany, until it was bought by Danish State Railways in 1957. It was then renumbered to DSB ML 6 and liveried in the dark green that the Danish diesel shunters were painted in. It served on shunting duties in Copenhagen yards until 1973, when it was finally withdrawn for good; it was scrapped in 1974 in Hedehusene in Denmark.

Technical details
The diesel engine is an English Electric 6-cylinder, 10-inch bore by 12-inch stroke (254 mm by 305 mm); 4-stroke, 6KT and the traction motors are two: EE506 axle-hung, nose-suspended, force-ventilated traction motors with 21.7:1 double reduction gear drive.  The main generator is an English Electric EE801, 441 A at 430 V.

Withdrawal
The 106 locomotives of British Railways were withdrawn between May 1967 and November 1972.

Post-BR use
Sixteen locomotives were sold to the National Coal Board, and were used in the North East, South Wales and the Kent Coalfield.

Preservation

None of the LMS examples were preserved but the following BR examples of Class 11 diesel shunters are preserved:
 12052 at Caledonian Railway
 12077 at Midland Railway - Butterley
 12083 at Battlefield Line Railway
 12088 at Aln Valley Railway
 12093 at Caledonian Railway
 12099 at Severn Valley Railway
 12131 at North Norfolk Railway
 A ninth example 12049 (renumbered from 12082) is preserved at the Watercress Line in Hampshire. At one time it was re-registered as 01553, in TOPS Class 01/5, carried both numbers and was owned by the Harry Needle Railroad Company. 12082 was renumbered to 12049 in October 2010 and painted in BR green with a late crest but without the yellow/black ends. This was as a replacement for the original Mid Hants locomotive 12049 that was scrapped after suffering catastrophic damage during an engine shed fire on 26 July 2010.

See also

 LMS diesel shunters

Footnotes

References

Further reading
 

11
English Electric locomotives
C locomotives
Railway locomotives introduced in 1945
Standard gauge locomotives of Great Britain
Diesel-electric locomotives of Great Britain
Shunting locomotives